Cenotaph Hill is a rock peak,  high, on the ridge separating the heads of Strom Glacier and Liv Glacier in the Queen Maud Mountains. It was visited by the Southern Party of the New Zealand Geological Survey Antarctic Expedition (1963–64) who gave this name because the unusual knob of rock forming the summit resembles a monument.

References 

Mountains of the Ross Dependency
Amundsen Coast